Ramon See Ang (born January 14, 1954), also known by his initials RSA, is a Filipino businessman. He is the president and chief executive officer (CEO) of Top Frontier Investment Holdings, Inc., the largest shareholder of San Miguel Corporation. He is also the president and CEO of SMC and the chairman of Cyber Bay Corporation and Eagle Cement Corporation.

Ang was elected vice-chairman of SMC in January 1999; and later as president and chief operating officer (COO) in March 2002. In June 2012, he gained control of SMC after acquiring the shares owned by Eduardo Cojuangco, Jr., a fellow Filipino businessman and politician. On April 15, 2021, ten months following the death of Cojuangco, SMC amended its by-laws to unify the role, functions and duties of chief executive officer (CEO) to that of the president. Based on the PSE disclosure following the 2021 annual stockholders' meeting of SMC, Ang remains as vice-chairman, president (CEO) and COO of the company.

Ang holds a Bachelor of Science degree in mechanical engineering from Far Eastern University.

References

External links

 Investing.businessweek.com
 People.nfo.ph

Far Eastern University alumni
Living people
Filipino billionaires
Filipino engineers
Filipino chief executives
Filipino people of Chinese descent
Chief operating officers
San Miguel Corporation people
1954 births